Indalo Protected Environment is the largest Protected Environment in the Eastern Cape of South Africa. It is made up of nine private game reserves in three local municipalities.

History 
This  Protected Environment was designated in 2018.

Biodiversity 
This Protected Environment consists of six of the nine vegetation types of South Africa, including Fynbos and Albany thickets.

Birds 
There are twelve threatened birds.

Fish 
It contains two threatened fish, including the critically endangered estuarine pipefish.

Mammals 
There are over 24,000 animals from 38 species, including big five game, with 15 being endangered like the black rhino.

Vegetation 
There are sixty threatened plant species.

Threats 
Threats facing the Protected Environment are wind farms, poaching, and fracking and mining.

See also 

 List of protected areas of South Africa

References 

Protected areas of South Africa